Peincess Roxandra or Roxana or Roksandra Skarlatovna Edling-Sturdza (1786 – 1844) was a philanthropist and a writer. Her chief achievement was the foundation of schools and orphanages for the young and needy refugees in Odessa during the years of wars and revolutions in the Balkans. She was a grandchild of the Grand Dragoman or Prince of Moldavia Constantine Mourousis; that and her own actions, vision, will and determination made her a prolific advocate of young refugee needs all over Europe.

Early life
Princess Roxandra was born on 12 October 1786 in Istanbul. Her parents were Prince Skarlat Sturdza and Princess Sultana Morouzi (1762-1839). Roxandra was a sister of Alexandru Sturdza and cousin of the Prince of Moldavia Mihail Sturdza.
In 1790, the Sturdza family moved to Iasi (Iași) Moldavia and then in 1800 settled in Saint Petersburg where Roxandra continued her education in Russian and Greek. In 1806 she became the master of ceremonies at the court of Alexander I of Russia and his wife Empress Elizabeth Alexeievna.
In 1809, Roxandra met Ioannis Kapodistrias the then Foreign Minister of the Russian Empire. This event was of great inspirational value and as a result the cultivated Roxandra was imbued with a sense of social purpose and philhellenism.

Family roots
Roxandra’s maternal grandfather was the Prince of Moldavia, Constantine Mourousis (1730-1783). The Mourousis family was from the Greek Phanar neighborhood of Constantinople. Members of this large family were cultural and political leaders of the Christian Ottoman subjects who assured a path of political ascendancy for the descendants.
Roxandra’s father Skarlat Sturdza, a  notable alumnus of Princely Academy of Iași, was a scion of the long Moldavian Sturdza family of Greek ancestry whose members were active in humanitarian affairs since the 16th century or earlier. Soon after the Sturdza family emigrated from Moldavia to Saint Petersburg, Russia, Skarlat became Empress Elizabeth Alexeievna’s counselor.

Marriage
In 1816, Roxandra married Count Albert Cajetan von Edling (1771-1841), Minister and Marshal of the Grand Duke of Saxony-Weimar.
Because of her marriage to Edling, Roxandra is also known as Countess Roxandra or Roksandra Skarlatovna Edling-Sturdza and for many years she maintained land properties and residences in Weimar, Berlin, Wien, Saint Petersburg, Wallachia, Bessarabia and Odessa. It is from these places that Roxandra devoted her time in philanthropic activities, she wrote her memoirs and became an ardent supporter of humanitarian affairs.

Achievements
Roxandra’s legacy was the influence on the future. Her enlightened views were influential in a period of multiple wars in Europe. She established schools and took a vocal stance on the issues of aid, tender care, sheltering and education during the Greek War of Independence (1821-1832). As an avid supporter of philhellenism she was further inspired by Ioannis Kapodistrias, the prominent figure of the Greek Revolutions in 1821  and the ensuing years, and the first head of state of the first independent Hellenic Republic (1827-1831).

Philanthropy and altruism
Roxandra sponsored activities and established an organization helping the disadvantaged children to live healthily. Noted for her philanthropy, she provided clothing and food from her own family farms in Bessarabia to help the poverty-stricken refugees who had reached Odessa in consequence of the long Greek struggle and rebellion for freedom against the Ottomans. Her actions were intended to bring culture, learning and occupation to those who suffered. Roxandra’s enlightened social approach was much admired all over the world.

She died on 16 January 1844, Odessa.

See also
 Princely Academy of Bucharest & Princely Academy of Iași
 Alexandru Ioan Cuza University
 Alexander Mourousis
 Phanariotes, Ioan Sturdza, Dimitrie Sturdza
 Phanar Greek Orthodox College
 Ypsilantis

Encyclopaedias, books and citations
 New International Encyclopedia, New York, Dodd & Mead
 Encyclopedia DRANDAKI-Μεγάλη Ελληνική Εγκυκλοπαίδεια ΔΡΑΝΔΑΚΗ, Π.-volume 22, page 412 Βικελαία Δημοτική Βιβλιοθήκη
 Encyclopedia HARH PATSH-ΧΑΡΗ ΠΑΤΣΗ Εθνική Βιβλιοθήκη της Ελλάδος 
 Encyclopedia YDRIA-ΥΔΡΙΑ • Encyclopedia DOMH • Encyclopedia PAPYRUS-LAROUSSE-BRITANNICA-Νεώτερο Εγκυκλοπαιδικό Λεξικό ΗΛΙΟΥ Εθνική Βιβλιοθήκη της Ελλάδος 
 A. Brezianu and V. Spanu, 2007, USA, Moruzi Constantin, History of Moldova 
 Maria Tsatsou, Ideogramma, Athens, Memoirs of Roxandra Sturdza

References, notes and sources

External links
 Phanariotes
 Google Books  Roxandra Sturdza
 ΑΡΓΟΛΙΚΗ ΑΡΧΕΙΑΚΗ ΒΙΒΛΙΟΘΗΚΗ ΙΣΤΟΡΙΑΣ ΚΑΙ ΠΟΛΙΤΙΣΜΟΥ Στούρτζα Ρωξάνδρα (1786-1844)

1786 births
1844 deaths
Roxandra
Mourouzis family
Emigrants from the Ottoman Empire to the Russian Empire
Memoirists from the Russian Empire
Writers from the Russian Empire
Women writers from the Russian Empire
Ladies-in-waiting from the Russian Empire
Women memoirists
19th-century memoirists
Constantinopolitan Greeks
Writers from Istanbul
Writers from Iași
Writers from Saint Petersburg